Ministry of Law may refer to:

 Ministry of Justice and Law (Colombia)
 Ministry of Law and Justice (India)
 Ministry of Law and Human Rights (Indonesia)
 Ministry of Security and Justice (Netherlands)
 Ministry of Law (Singapore)
 Ministry of Justice (Sri Lanka)
 Ministry of Law, Justice and Parliamentary Affairs for Bangladesh
 Ministry of Law and Justice (Pakistan)
 Minister for Law and Justice (Pakistan)

See also
 Law ministry (United Kingdom), the British government led by Bonar Law from 1922 to 1923